Posterior interventricular may refer to:

 Posterior interventricular artery
 Posterior interventricular sulcus